Sookmoy Roy (fl. 19th century) was a 19th-century Indian businessman, who is most notable for becoming the first Indian director of the Bank of Bengal, which is one of the predecessors of the State Bank of India. He died in 1811.

Biography 

He was the grandson of Lakshmikanta Dhar, who was notable for being the chief banker to Robert Clive.

Career 

In 1809, he became a member of the very first board of directors of the Bank of Bengal. The board included others such as Henry St George Tucker, who was the accountant general of the East India Company in Bengal Presidency. 
Other members of the very first board of directors of the Bank of Bengal include: Alex Colvin, John Palmer, James Alexander, George Tyler, and John W. Fulton.

Litigation 

He has been named in a major lawsuit of the 19th century namely Sookmoy Roy v. Ramnarain Missery and Ramsunder Bonnajee which involved the non payment of interest on a Sicca banknote.

Philanthropy 

He is well remembered for his philanthropic contributions. He made a gift of Rs. 1.50 lakh for the construction of the Cuttack Road and caravanserais for the convenience of pilgrims travelling to the Jagannath Temple, Puri.

See also

 Henry St George Tucker
 Bank of Bengal

References

External links 

 Official Biography
 History of Bank of Bengal

Indian businesspeople
19th-century Indian businesspeople
Indian company founders
Businesspeople from Kolkata